The Gargantua River is a river in the Algoma District of Ontario, Canada.

See also
List of Ontario rivers

References

Rivers of Algoma District
Tributaries of Lake Superior